Stefano Ianni and Cristian Villagrán were the defending champions but choose not to compete in the 2010 Carisap Tennis CupThomas Fabbiano and Gabriel Trujillo-Soler won the final against Francesco Aldi and Daniele Giorgini, 7–6(4), 7–6(5)

Seeds

Main draw

Draw

References
Main Draw

Carisap Tennis Cup - Doubles
ATP Challenger San Benedetto